Shaitan is singular for a demon in Islamic belief. Alternative transliterations include Shaytan, Sheitan, Shaitaan, Shaytaan, Sheitaan and Shai'tan.

The term most often refers specifically to the concept of devil in Islam. 

It may also refer to:

Films
 Shaitaan (1974 film), an Indian film
 Sheitan (2006 film), a French film
 Shaitan (2011 film), an Indian film

Other uses
 Shaitan elchini,  a genus of spiders
 Shai'tan, a concept/character in The Wheel of Time
 Gerd Sheytan, a village in Iran